General elections were held in the Marshall Islands on 22 December 1978.

Results
Sixty candidates contested the 14 seats in the Legislature. In addition to the elected members, the Marshallese former members of the Congress of the Trust Territory of the Pacific Islands were appointed at-large members of the Legislature; these included senators Amata Kabua and Wilfred Kendall and representatives Ataji Balos, Chuji Chutaro, John Heine, Ekpap Silk and Ruben Zackhras.

References

Marshall
1978 in the Trust Territory of the Pacific Islands
Elections in the Marshall Islands